Caton may refer to:

Places
Caton, Devon, location in England
Caton, Lancashire, village in Lancashire, England
Caton, New York, town in USA
Caton, Tennessee, unincorporated community in USA

Other
Caton (surname)
French ship Caton (1777), later HMS Caton

See also
 Including further people with the surname